The Coliseum Burgos, formerly named as Plaza de Toros de Burgos, is an indoor arena mainly used as bullring located in Burgos, Spain.

History

Plaza de Toros de Burgos (1967–2015)

Built between 1966 and 1967, the bullring was inaugurated on 28 June 1967 with a corrida by Jaime Ostos, El Cordobés and Tinín.

In 1975, the bullring hosted the first pop music festival in Spain, known as La Cochambre, including performances of several Spanish bands.

Its façade had three big doors and a bullring was able for a capacity for 12,277 spectators.

Coliseum Burgos (2015–present)

In 2013, mayor Javier Lacalle announced the intention of building a new indoor arena due to the risk of collapse of the bullring, but due to its high costs, the solution was to integrally renovate the bullring and to add a roof.

The renovation finished in 2015 and the arena was re-inaugurated on 27 June 2015 with the first corrida of the 2015 local season, with bullfighters Enrique Ponce, El Juli and Alejandro Talavante.

On 18 August 2015, the Spain national team played its inaugural match in the arena. It was a friendly game against Venezuela. One year later, Spain would play again in the Coliseum, this time against Angola.

In 2017, after the promotion of local basketball club CB Miraflores to the Spanish top league, it started to play their home matches at the Coliseum. The first official match was played on 1 October 2017 and ended with a loss of the host team against Iberostar Tenerife by 65–81, in front of 8,817 spectators.

On 26 November 2017, the arena hosted the 2019 World Cup qualifier match between Spain and European champions Slovenia, where the locals won by 92–84.

Attendances
This is a list of games attendances of CB Miraflores at Coliseum Burgos.

See also
 List of indoor arenas in Spain

References

External links

Coliseum Burgos at the Burgos City Hall website 

Bullrings in Spain
Buildings and structures in Burgos
Indoor arenas in Spain
Buildings and structures completed in 1967